The Samsung Galaxy Watch 3 (stylized as Samsung Galaxy Watch3) is a smartwatch developed by Samsung Electronics that was released on August 5, 2020 at Samsung's Unpacked Event alongside the flagships of the Galaxy Note series and Galaxy Z series, i.e., the Samsung Galaxy Note 20 and Samsung Galaxy Z Fold 2, respectively.

Due to limitations of the COVID-19 pandemic on certain social gatherings, the smartwatch was released via Samsung's online channels.

Specifications

Hardware 
The Galaxy Watch 3 comes with a 1.4 (360×360) inch circular Super AMOLED display with a pixel density of 257 ppi (360 pixels/1.4 inches= 257.14 Pixels/Inch), powered by a non-removable 340 mAh battery and recharged using Qi inductive charging. The smartwatch has 1GB of RAM and 8GB of internal storage. The Galaxy Watch 3 also features a fully rotatable physical bezel with the display glass made from Corning Gorilla Glass DX. The device is compatible with a 20 or 22mm straps, depending on model. The Galaxy Watch 3 comes in Bronze, Black, and Silver colour options.

Software 
The smartwatch was released with Tizen 5.5 that features Samsung's unique software overlay.

Pricing 
The Galaxy Watch 3 has a retail price of US$399 for the 41mm and US$479 for the 45mm option.

Reception 
Ars Technica called Galaxy Watch 3 a "refresh" of Galaxy Watch Active2, which does not have "a ton in the way of new features outside of added fall detection", but "offers all the conveniences you’d expect, like the ability to take calls, check voicemails, and send texts".

Engadget called Galaxy Watch 3 "the best non-Apple smartwatch".

See also 
 Samsung Galaxy S21

References

External links 

Samsung
Samsung Galaxy
Samsung wearable devices
Smartwatches